The 5 euro cent coin (€0.05) has a value of one twentieth of a euro and is composed of copper-covered steel. All coins have a common reverse and country-specific (national) obverse. The coin has been used since 2002 and was not re-designed in 2007 as was the case with the higher-value coins.

History
The coin dates from 2002, when euro coins and banknotes were introduced in the 12-member eurozone and its related territories. The common side was designed by Luc Luycx, a Belgian artist who won a Europe-wide competition to design the new coins. The design of the 1 to 5-cent coins was intended to show the European Union's (EU) place in the world (relative to Africa and Asia) while the one and two euro coins showed the 15 states as one and the 10- to 50-cent coins showed separate EU states.

The design of the national sides, then fifteen (eurozone plus Monaco, San Marino and the Vatican who could also mint their own coins) was the subject of national competitions, but was subject to some uniform specifications such as the requirement to include twelve stars (see euro coins for more). National designs were not allowed to change until the end of 2008, unless a monarch (whose portrait usually appears on the coins) dies or abdicates. This happened in Monaco and the Vatican City, resulting in three new designs in circulation (the Vatican had an interim design until the new Pope was elected). National designs have seen some changes as new rules required that national designs should include the name of the issuing country: neither Finland and Belgium had shown their name, and so made minor changes.

As the EU's membership has since expanded in 2004 and 2007, with further expansions envisaged, the common face of all euro coins from the value of 10-cent and above were redesigned in 2007 to show a new map. The 1- to 5-cent coins, however, did not change, as the highlighting of the old members over the globe was so faint it was not considered worth the cost. However, new national coin designs were added in 2007 with the entry of Slovenia, in 2008 with Cyprus and Malta, in 2009 with Slovakia, in 2011 with Estonia, in 2014 with Latvia, in 2015 with Lithuania, and in 2023 with Croatia.

Design

The coins are composed of copper-covered steel, with a diameter of 21.25 mm, a 1.67 mm thickness and a mass of 3.92 grams. Coincidentally, the dimensions (though not the mass or composition) are nearly identical to those of Canadian and United States 5-cent coins. The coins' edges are smooth. The coins have been used from 2002, though some are dated 1999 which is the year the euro was created as a currency, but not put into general circulation.

Reverse (common) side
The reverse was designed by Luc Luycx and displays a globe in the bottom right. The (then 15) members of the EU are lightly highlighted and the northern part of Africa and the western part of Asia (including the Middle East) are shown. Six fine lines cut diagonally behind the globe from each side of the coin and have twelve stars at their ends (reflective of the flag of Europe). To the top left is a large number 5 followed, in smaller text, by the words "Euro Cent". The designer's initials, LL, appear to the right of the globe.

Starting in 2017 coins from individual member states have started adjusting their common side design to a new version, identified by smaller and more rounded numeral "5" and longer lines outside of the stars at the coin's circumference.

Obverse (national) sides
The obverse side of the coin depends on the issuing country. All have to include twelve stars (in most cases arranged in a circle around the edge), the engraver's initials and the year of issue. New designs also have to include the name or initials of the issuing country. The side cannot repeat the denomination of the coin unless the issuing country uses an alphabet other than Latin (currently, Greece and Cyprus are the only such countries, hence Greece engraves "5 ΛΕΠΤΑ" (5 lepta) on its coins).

Planned designs

Austria, Germany and Greece will also at some point need to update their designs to comply with guidelines stating they must include the issuing state's name or initials, and not repeat the denomination of the coin.

In addition, there are several EU states that have not yet adopted the euro. Some of them have already agreed upon their coin designs; however, it is not known if or when they will adopt the currency, and hence these are not yet minted. See enlargement of the Eurozone for expected entry dates of these countries.

Nicknames
In the Netherlands, the coin carries the nickname stuiver, carried over from the previous currency.
In Italy, the 5 cent coin along with the 1 cent and the 2 cent ones are informally referred as ramini (from rame, copper) or bronzini (from bronzo, bronze).

References

External links

 

Five-cent coins
Euro coins